Ricky Patton (born April 6, 1954) is a former professional American football player who played running back for five seasons for the Atlanta Falcons, Green Bay Packers, and San Francisco 49ers.  He started in Super Bowl XVI for the 49ers.

References

1954 births
Living people
American football running backs
Atlanta Falcons players
Green Bay Packers players
Jackson State Tigers football players
San Francisco 49ers players
Players of American football from Flint, Michigan